Bacillus circulans is a soil-dwelling human pathogen which has been associated with "septicemia, mixed abscess infections, and wound infections", as well as with meningitis.

This species has been recently transferred into the genus Niallia. The correct nomenclature is Niallia circulans.

Morphology

Staining
Gram-positive, Gram-variable or Gram-negative. Positive spore stain result.

Shape and size

Vegetative cell
Straight, occasionally curved rods, 2.0-4.2 x 0.5-0.8 μm, motile by peritrichous flagella.

Spores
Has ellipsoidal spores which are subterminal or terminal; swelling the sporangia. These are "centrally located" and either cylindrical or "Kidney-shaped".

References

External links
Type strain of Bacillus circulans at BacDive -  the Bacterial Diversity Metadatabase

circulans
Bacteria described in 1890